Willer Express (stylized WILLER EXPRESS) is a major highway bus company operating in Japan since 2005 with routes spanning almost the entire country, from Aomori Prefecture at the northern tip of the main island Honshu to the southern island Kyushu. Annual sales are approximately $120 million/year, with both domestic passengers and foreigners served through direct sales, a website, as well as the "Japan Bus Pass" and a double-decker tour bus route. Pricing on routes depends on day/time of travel, with significant variation between peak and off-peak travel.

Overview
Willer Express is a subsidiary of the Willer Group, the company which owns Willer Alliance Inc. and Willer Express Japan Inc. As of December 2015, Willer Express employed a total of 64 people. The company's President is Shigetaka Murase. It has offices in Osaka and Tokyo.

The company began in 2006 as a major Tour Bus company in Japan. From December 2011 it also entered the intercities bus business.

Business offices 

Osaka Main Office; at Umeda Sky Building
Tokyo Main Office; at Shinagawa Intercity Building
WILLER Express Cafe; at Umeda Sky Building

Main Highway bus routes

Tokyo - Kyoto, Osaka, Wakayama
Tokyo - Nagoya
Tokyo - Hiroshima
Tokyo - Okayama
Tokyo - Sendai
Tokyo - Niigata
Tokyo - Nagano
Tokyo - Toyama, Kanazawa, Fukui
Tokyo - Izumo, Shimane
Tokyo - Ise,  Mie
Osaka - Nagoya
Osaka - Shizuoka
Osaka - Niigata
Osaka - Toyama
Osaka - Izumo, Shimane
Osaka - Hiroshima
Osaka - Matsuyama
Osaka - Hakata, Saga
Hiroshima - Hakata, Saga

References

External links
 Official English website 

Japanese companies established in 2005
Bus companies of Japan
Companies based in Osaka Prefecture
Transport companies established in 2005